Spy Kids: All the Time in the World (also known as Spy Kids 4-D: All the Time in the World) is a 2011 American spy action comedy film written and directed by Robert Rodriguez. It is the fourth and final installment in the original Spy Kids film series, and is a stand-alone sequel to 2003's Spy Kids 3-D: Game Over. The film stars Rowan Blanchard, Mason Cook, Jessica Alba, Joel McHale, Alexa Vega, Daryl Sabara, Ricky Gervais, and Jeremy Piven. It is the first film in the series without the participation of Antonio Banderas or Carla Gugino and not to be distributed by Miramax Films.

The film held its world premiere screening on July 31, 2011, in Los Angeles, California and was then released in the United States on August 19. It is the only film in the series that uses "Aroma-scope" to allow people to smell odors and aromas from the film via scratch & sniff cards (reminiscent of the 1981 film Polyester).

Plot 

OSS agent Marissa Wilson is attempting to capture a criminal named Tick Tock, who purchases a mini-disk stolen from the OSS. Despite being nine months pregnant, she continues her pursuit against the admonitions of her boss Danger D'Amo. Tick Tock is captured and the mini-disk, which contains information on a weapon of mass destruction called Project: Armageddon, is retrieved.

At the hospital, Marissa meets her spy-hunting TV host husband, Wilbur, and her two stepchildren, twins Rebecca and Cecil. Marissa gives birth to a daughter, Maria. A year later, Wilbur has created a 5-year plan in which if his show is successful, he will spend more time with the kids. Rebecca does not accept Marissa as a replacement for her deceased mother and delights in playing pranks on her. Attempting to strengthen her rapport with Rebecca, Marissa gives her a red-sapphire necklace. The media reports that time is speeding up at an increasing rate.

A criminal mastermind called the Time Keeper claims responsibility, saying that he will unleash Project: Armageddon as a punishment upon a society that he believes wastes time with meaningless pursuits instead of treasuring time with their loved ones. The Time Keeper demands that Tick Tock bring him the Chronos Sapphire, which is revealed to be the jewel in the necklace Marissa gave to Rebecca. The OSS calls Marissa out of retirement and instructs her to bring the Sapphire with her. When Marissa asks for it from Rebecca, it further strains their relationship.

At OSS Headquarters, Marissa discovers that Rebecca has swapped out the Chronos Sapphire for baby food. Tick Tock's henchmen break into Marissa's house, and Rebecca and Cecil are directed to take refuge in a Panic Room, where they view a video of Marissa informing them of her secret career and that their dog Argonaut is a talking, weaponized robot. The twins escape and go to OSS headquarters, where Marissa's niece and their step-cousin, Carmen Cortez, gives the twins a tour of the defunct Spy Kids Division, allowing them to take a gadget as a souvenir each.

The twins go after the Time Keeper, where their search leads them to a clock shop, which is Tick Tock's headquarters. The twins view a video of the Wells Experiment, which reveals the nature of the Chronos Sapphire in Rebecca's necklace, as it saves a boy frozen in time by the experiment. The twins are captured by Tick Tock but are rescued by Marissa and Carmen, though Tick Tock manages to steal the Sapphire. Wilbur begins an investigation to capture his first spy and unknowingly captures footage of his family fighting off the Time Keeper's henchmen.

Shocked to learn that Marissa is a spy, he gets fired when he destroys the footage that he and his cameraman filmed of the battle and becomes estranged from Marissa and the children. As time continues to speed up, OSS agents are debriefed on the Wells Experiment. The OSS shut down the experiment and place the device under lockdown. Among the agents assigned to the case is Carmen's estranged brother, Juni Cortez. The twins confront Danger over the fact that his watch is similar to the one worn by the Time Keeper, and his name is an anagram of "Armageddon".

He reveals that he is the Time Keeper and imprisons them in their room. When a group of OSS agents led by Marissa, Carmen, and Juni return to the clock shop to confront the Time Keeper, he freezes the agents in time using circuitry in their ID badges and does the same to 18 major cities. Juni, who wasn't frozen due to Carmen angrily throwing away his ID badge into the trash, manages to free Marissa and Carmen. Danger reveals the Armageddon Device was created to travel back in time and that his father was head of the Wells Experiment, and he was the boy frozen in time.

His father spent the rest of his life trying unsuccessfully to set him free. The OSS managed to shut down the experiment with a solution that "literally fell from the sky", the Chronos Sapphire. Now, Danger plans to use the Armageddon Device to go back in time to spend more time with his father. Cecil deduces that Danger has already tried this before multiple times, but he comes back worse each time and reveals that Tick Tock and his minions are all versions of himself. Rebecca tells Danger that he should use what time he has wisely instead of trying to acquire more.

Danger enters the finally open time vortex and goes to finally meets his father, then he returns as an elderly form of himself and realizes that Cecil was right. He shuts down the device, and Tick Tock is apprehended by Wilbur, who is reunited with Marissa and the children, promising he won't wait to have time for them, instead he will make time for them. Carmen and Juni announce they will co-lead a revived Spy Kids program, while Rebecca and Cecil become recruiters of new agents, including the kids watching the movie.

Cast 
 Rowan Blanchard as Rebecca Wilson, Wilbur's daughter and Marissa's step-daughter.
 Mason Cook as Cecil Wilson, Wilbur's son and Marissa's step-son who has hearing loss.
 Jessica Alba as Marissa Wilson (née Cortez), Rebecca and Cecil's step-mother, Gregorio and Machete's sister, and Carmen and Juni's paternal aunt.
 Joel McHale as Wilbur Wilson, Marissa's spy-hunting reporter husband.
 Alexa Vega as Carmen Cortez, a top-secret agent for the OSS and former Spy Kid.
 Daryl Sabara as Juni Cortez, Carmen's brother, a formerly retired OSS agent and former Spy Kid.
 Ricky Gervais as the voice of Argonaut, Rebecca and Cecil's robot dog.
 Jeremy Piven as Dane "Danger" D'Amo/Timekeeper, the leader of OSS who becomes a supervillain. Piven also portrays Tick-Tock, the Timekeeper's second in command, as well as Professor D'Amo (Danger's father) and the Time Keeper's henchmen.

Additionally, Belle and Genny Solorzano portray Maria Wilson/Spy Baby, Marissa and Wilbur's daughter, and Rebecca and Cecil's half-sister. Danny Trejo portrays Isador "Machete" Cortez, Carmen and Juni's uncle and Marissa's brother and Angela Lanza portrays Female Spy OSS Agent.

Production

Development 
Robert Rodriguez was prompted by an incident on the set of Machete (a stand-alone film focusing on the Spy Kids supporting character of the same name) to start envisioning a fourth main film in the Spy Kids series. Star Jessica Alba had her then-one year old baby Honor Marie and was dressed to appear on camera when her baby's diaper "exploded". Watching Alba change the diaper while trying not to get anything on her clothes prompted Rodriguez to think "What about a spy mom?" Production on the film was officially announced in September 2009, six years after the release of Spy Kids 3-D: Game Over, by Dimension Films. The script for the film was completed by Robert Rodriguez in December the same year. The title for the film was officially revealed as Spy Kids: All the Time in the World as well as an August 2011 release window, which was later updated to an August 19 release date.

Filming 
Filming began on October 27, 2010 and concluded in February 2011.

Release

Home media 
The film was released on DVD, Blu-ray, 3D Blu-ray and on DVD + Blu-ray + Digital Copy combo packs on November 22, 2011.

Reception

Box office 
The film took in $4 million on its opening day and $11 million over the three-day weekend, debuting in third place behind The Help and Rise of the Planet of the Apes. That was on the low end of expectations, but an executive of The Weinstein Company said: "We're okay with this number. We're going to be in good shape with this film, and it will play for the rest of the summer". The following weekend, it dropped 48% to $6 million, and took sixth place, and on the following weekend, it earned an additional $6.8 million over the four-day Labor Day Weekend. As of November 2011, the film earned $38 million in the U.S and $47 million in other countries for a worldwide gross of $85 million, becoming the poorest performing film in the series.

Critical response 
Spy Kids: All the Time in the World received generally negative reviews. On Rotten Tomatoes the film has an approval rating of 23% based on reviews from 61 critics, with an average rating of 3.9 out of 10. The websites consensus states: "Burdened by a rote plot and unfunny scatological humor, All the Time in the World suggests that the Spy Kids franchise has run its course". On Metacritic it has a score of 37 out of 100 based on 14 reviews, indicating "generally unfavorable reviews". CinemaScore polls reported that the average grade moviegoers gave the film was a "B+" on an A+ to F scale. Common Sense Media gave the film 1 out of 5 stars. The website reads: "Positive messages can't save worst film in action series".

Accolades

Other media

Cancelled sequel 
Dimension Films had announced the fifth installment in the Spy Kids film series following Spy Kids: All the Time in the World. It was under talks to have the original cast expected to return. However, the film was permanently delayed from its intended 2012 production, as the film's stars Rowan Blanchard and Mason Cook, who are no longer kids, were both committed to other projects (Girl Meets World and Speechless respectively), and the planned sequel got cancelled as a result.

Animated television series 

An animated series based on the films, Spy Kids: Mission Critical, was released in 2018 on Netflix.

Reboot film 
A reboot of the film series, titled Spy Kids: Armageddon, is in development, with Robert Rodriguez serving as the director and writer of the film and is a joint-venture production between Skydance Media and Spyglass Media Group. Netflix acquired the distribution rights for the film. The film's title was the original title for Spy Kids: All the Time in the World. Gina Rodriguez, Zachary Levi, Everly Carganilla, Connor Esterson and Billy Magnussen were set to star in the film.

Notes 

 The Walt Disney Company had to cut their own share with The Weinstein Company to 5% after the latter party lost their bid to reclaim Miramax Films.

References

External links 

 

2011 films
2011 3D films
2010s adventure comedy films
4D films
American sequel films
American adventure comedy films
2000s comedy mystery films
American children's comedy films
American mystery films
American children's adventure films
American spy action films
American spy comedy films
American detective films
Dimension Films films
2010s English-language films
Films scored by Robert Rodriguez
Films directed by Robert Rodriguez
Films produced by Elizabeth Avellán
Films produced by Robert Rodriguez
Films with scents
Films about kidnapping
Films with screenplays by Robert Rodriguez
Spy Kids
Films shot in Austin, Texas
Films about time travel
Troublemaker Studios films
The Weinstein Company films
2010s spy comedy films
2010s children's comedy films
2011 comedy films
2010s American films